Sonapur, literally Land of Gold in Hindi and Urdu, can refer to the following places:
 Sonapur, an unofficial name for the labor accommodations in Muhaisnah, Dubai.
 Sonepur district, in the Indian state of Orissa.
 Sonapur (Assam), a town near the Indian city of Guwahati.
 Sonapur, Bheri, a village development committee in Nepal.
 Sonapur, Kosi, a village development committee in Nepal.